Pauline Morel (born 3 January 1992) is a French female artistic gymnast and part of the national team.

She participated at the 2008 Summer Olympics.
She participated at the 2010 World Artistic Gymnastics Championships in Rotterdam, the Netherlands.

References

External links
Pauline Morel at Sports Reference
http://www.intlgymnast.com/index.php?option=com_content&view=article&id=253&catid=5:competition-reports&Itemid=221
https://thecscore.wordpress.com/2008/12/17/french-team-training-at-grieux-until-christmas-pauline-morel-to-continue/
http://www.gettyimages.com/photos/pauline-morel?excludenudity=true&sort=mostpopular&mediatype=photography&phrase=pauline%20morel&family=editorial
https://www.youtube.com/watch?v=hmtWKHLciI0

1992 births
Living people
French female artistic gymnasts
Place of birth missing (living people)
Olympic gymnasts of France
Gymnasts at the 2008 Summer Olympics
Mediterranean Games gold medalists for France
Mediterranean Games silver medalists for France
Mediterranean Games bronze medalists for France
Mediterranean Games medalists in gymnastics
Competitors at the 2009 Mediterranean Games
21st-century French women